Ubisoft Quebec is a Canadian video game developer and a studio of Ubisoft based in Quebec City. The studio was established in June 2005 and is best known for its work in the Assassin's Creed franchise.

History 
French video game publisher Ubisoft announced its plans to open a development studio in Quebec City in April 2005. The studio, Ubisoft Quebec, was formally opened on 27 June 2005. Its founders were Nicolas Rioux and Andrée Cossette, of whom Rioux was appointed as general manager. In June 2008, Ubisoft Quebec announced that it had established a computer-generated imagery production arm that would work in conjunction with distributor Guillemot. The unit was closed down again with the foundation of Ubisoft Motion Pictures in May 2011.

Longtail Studios's Quebec City development studio was acquired by Ubisoft in March 2010 and merged into Ubisoft Quebec. Forty-eight employees were transferred to Ubisoft Quebec, while another 6–7, including the acquired studio's manager, departed. In June 2013, François Pelland was appointed as Ubisoft Quebec's executive director of development. In September 2013, Ubisoft announced its intent to invest  in Ubisoft Quebec over seven years to create up to 500 jobs. Following onto another  investment in July 2014, Ubisoft Quebec stated that it would move to new offices in the Saint-Roch neighbourhood of Quebec City and open another 100 positions.

When Rioux became "vice president of technology" for all of Ubisoft's Canadian studios in November 2017, Patrick Klaus was appointed Ubisoft Quebec's managing director, with Cossette as associate managing director. In December 2018, Mike Laidlaw joined the studio as creative director, having previously stepped down from the same position at BioWare, before departing again in February 2020. The Saint-Roch location, known as UbiNord, was opened in April 2019. Cossette succeeded Klaus as managing director in November 2019, after Klaus had left the studio earlier that year. Cossette left Ubisoft Quebec in July 2020.

Games developed 
After developing expansion packs for Assassin's Creed III and Assassin's Creed IV: Black Flag, Ubisoft Quebec became the first Ubisoft studio outside Ubisoft Montreal to lead the development of a mainline Assassin's Creed game. The studio's first Assassin's Creed game was Assassin's Creed Syndicate, which was released in October 2015, and continued with Assassin's Creed Odyssey, released in October 2018.

The studio ventured into mobile game development, collaborating with Ubisoft Montreal on Tom Clancy's Rainbow Six Mobile for Android and iOS, announced on April 5, 2022. The title is the adapted version for mobile devices of Tom Clancy's Rainbow Six Siege, a successful tactical shooter game belonging to the Tom Clancy's Rainbow Six series, which Ubisoft Montreal released in December 2015 for PC and consoles.

References

External links 
 

2005 establishments in Quebec
Canadian companies established in 2005
Canadian subsidiaries of foreign companies
Companies based in Quebec City
Ubisoft divisions and subsidiaries
Video game companies established in 2005
Video game companies of Canada
Video game development companies